Tesseralik Island is an uninhabited island in the Qikiqtaaluk Region of Nunavut, Canada. It is located in the Cumberland Sound, off Baffin Island's Cumberland Peninsula, and is one of the islands forming Brown Harbour. Akulagok Island, Aupaluktok Island, Beacon Island, Kekerten Island, Kekertukdjuak Island, Miliakdjuin Island, Tuapait Island, and Ugpitimik Island are in the vicinity.

References

External links 
 Tesseralik Island in the Atlas of Canada - Toporama; Natural Resources Canada

Islands of Baffin Island
Islands of Cumberland Sound
Uninhabited islands of Qikiqtaaluk Region